Michael Aaron Swift (born February 28, 1974) is a retired American football defensive back who played in 28 NFL games over the 1997–2000 seasons.

References

External links
NFL profile

1974 births
Living people
American football cornerbacks
Carolina Panthers players
Jacksonville Jaguars players
People from Dyersburg, Tennessee
Players of American football from Tennessee
Rhein Fire players
San Diego Chargers players